The Serie B 1966–67 was the thirty-fifth tournament of this competition played in Italy since its creation.

Teams
Savona, Arezzo and Salernitana had been promoted from Serie C, while Sampdoria, Catania and Varese had been relegated from Serie A.

The Genoa’s “derby” was played in Serie B for the first time.

Events
Transitional promotions and relegations were imposed by the reduction of the Serie A.

Final classification

Results

References and sources
Almanacco Illustrato del Calcio - La Storia 1898-2004, Panini Edizioni, Modena, September 2005

Serie B seasons
2
Italy